Acrossocheilus microstoma is a species of cyprinid fish native to freshwater in northwestern Vietnam. It has sometimes included in A. iridescens as a subspecies.

References

Fish of Asia
Microstoma
Fish described in 1936